Mandy Parnell is a British audio mastering engineer, founder and senior mastering engineer at Black Saloon Studios in London, England. Parnell has worked on projects with a wide variety of artists including Aphex Twin, The XX, Feist, Sigur Ros, Bjork, The Knife, Frightened Rabbit and Brian Eno.

Career 
Mandy Parnell studied music and music technology throughout her school, college and university years, training and working in recording studios, until landing an internship at a mastering studio where she worked her way up through the ranks. She has over 25 years of experience, with her work being nominated and awarded numerous prizes including Grammy Awards and Mastering Engineer of the Year 2015 at the Music Producers Guild (MPG) Awards.

Mandy Parnell is an active member of the Audio Engineering Society (AES), and has lectured about mastering at international AES conventions in Los Angeles, Paris, New York and the UK.

Awards and nominations 

 Short listed, Mastering Engineer of the Year, MPG Awards 2014.
 Winner, Mastering Engineer of the Year, MPG Awards 2015.
 Short listed, Mastering Engineer of the Year (Jamie xx: In Colour), MPG Awards 2016.

References 

Year of birth missing (living people)
Living people
English audio engineers
Women audio engineers